Haldeman is one of 13 unincorporated communities located within Rowan County, Kentucky. It is 6 miles northeast of Rowan's largest city, Morehead.

History and notable buildings
Haldeman was established in 1907 by L. P. Haldeman in order to house workers for his Kentucky Firebrick Company. 15 years later in 1922, a second and more efficient brick plant opened in Haldeman. It was estimated that several hundred workers were employed by these plants during their operation. Shortly after the Second World War did the original plant close, and it wasn't until 1958 that the second would follow, ceasing all brick making operations for the community. Along with the brick factories there was also a school constructed in 1936 that was ultimately closed in 1991, and partially destroyed by an arsonist's fire on September 28, 2007. The post office was built at the beginning of the towns formation, and was in operation from 1907 to 1997.

References

Unincorporated communities in Rowan County, Kentucky